There and Back Again is the subtitle to The Hobbit, a 1937 novel by J. R. R. Tolkien.

There and Back Again may also refer to:

Music
 There and Back Again (Vertical Horizon album), 1992
 There and Back Again (Phil Lesh album), 2002
 "There and Back Again", a song by Twilight Force from the album Heroes of Mighty Magic
 "There and Back Again", a song by Daughtry from the album Daughtry

Other uses
 The Hobbit: The Battle of the Five Armies or The Hobbit: There and Back Again, a 2014 film 
 There and Back Again, A Hobbit's Holiday, a part of the fictional manuscript Red Book of Westmarch
 There and Back Again (novel), a 1999 novel by Pat Murphy, retelling The Hobbit as space opera
 There and Back, a memoir by Royal Navy officer Jeremy Black
 There and Back Again: A Memoir, a memoir by actor Sean Astin, who starred in the Lord of the Rings film trilogy

See also
 "To Where and Back Again", a 2016 episode of My Little Pony: Friendship Is Magic
 There and Back (disambiguation)